George Milton Corlett (November 7, 1884 – February 16, 1955) was the 24th Lieutenant Governor of Colorado, serving from 1927 to 1931 under William Herbert Adams.

References

External links

Lieutenant Governors of Colorado
1884 births
1955 deaths